Phyllomedusinae is a subfamily of hylid tree frogs found in the Neotropics commonly called leaf frogs. Formerly, they were often considered as their own family, Phyllomedusidae.

The subfamily is considered to be the sister group to the Australian treefrogs (Pelodryadinae), a subfamily of frogs known from Australia and New Guinea, despite being very geographically separated from them. The common ancestor of both subfamilies is thought to have lived in early Cenozoic South America, where the Phyllomedusinae still live, with the two families diverging from one another during the Eocene. The ancestors of Pelodryadinae likely colonized Australasia from South America via Antarctica, which at the time was not yet frozen over. The clade comprising both subfamilies is sister to the Hylinae, from which they diverged in the early Paleogene.

Taxonomy 
The subfamily Phyllomedusidae contains the following genera:
 Agalychnis (14 species)
 Callimedusa (six species)
 Cruziohyla  (three species)
 Hylomantis – rough leaf frogs (two species)
 Phasmahyla – shining leaf frogs (eight species)
 Phrynomedusa – colored leaf frogs (five living species, plus one recently extinct)
 Phyllomedusa (16 species)
 Pithecopus (12 species)

References

External links 

 Amphibian Species of the World
 http://www.tolweb.org/Phyllomedusinae
 http://amphibiaweb.org/lists/Hylidae.shtml

 
Amphibian subfamilies
Taxa named by Albert Günther